Home State Life Insurance Company was an Oklahoma-based insurance company that operated from 1929 to 1958, when it became part of American American General Life Insurance Company. The company was founded by Joe D. Morris as an insurance and investment enterprise, and it grew to become one of the largest firms serving Oklahoma City.

In 1945, Morris acquired the former India Temple Shrine Building, which he remodeled to serve as the company's offices. The building, now known as the Journal Record Building, is located in downtown Oklahoma City and is listed on the National Register of Historic Places.

Home State Life Insurance Company offered a range of insurance products, including life, accident, and health insurance. The company also provided investment services, such as annuities and retirement plans.

In 1958, Home State Life Insurance Company was acquired by American General Life Insurance Company, a Houston-based insurance company. Following the acquisition, the Home State Life Insurance Company ceased to exist as a separate entity and became part of American General Life Insurance Company.

References 

American International Group
Companies based in Oklahoma City
Financial services companies established in 1929
Financial services companies disestablished in 1958
Insurance companies of the United States
1929 establishments in Oklahoma
1958 disestablishments in Oklahoma
1958 mergers and acquisitions